Spyridium coalitum is a species of flowering plant in the family Rhamnaceae and is endemic to Kangaroo Island in South Australia. It is a slender, erect shrub with softly-hairy young stems, oblong to narrowly elliptic leaves, and head of white to cream-coloured flowers.

Description
The upper surface of the leaves is greyish-green and the lower surface is densely hairy.

Taxonomy
Spyridium coalitum was first formally described in 2012 by Jürgen Kellermann and William Barker in the journal Muelleria. It had previously been known as Spyridium halmaturinum var. integrifolium J.M.Black, first published in the Transactions and Proceedings of the Royal Society of South Australia in 1925. The specific epithet (coalitum) means "united by growth", referring to the stipules that are partly fused.

Distribution
This species of Spyridium grows in coastal heath, shrubland and forest on limestone, and is endemic to Kangaroo Island in South Australia.

References

coalitum
Rosales of Australia
Flora of South Australia
Plants described in 2012